The Order of Saemaeul Service Merit (Hangul: 새마을훈장, Hanja: 새마을勳章) is an order of merit of South Korea (the Republic of Korea). It is presented to individuals who contributed to the social development of the country through the New Community Movement.

Grades
The Order of Saemaeul Service Merit is divided into five classes. The grades are as follows: 
 Jarip Medal: 자립장 (自立章)
 Jajo Medal: 자조장 (自助章)
 Hyeopdong Medal: 협동장 (協同章)
 Geunmyeon Medal: 근면장 (勤勉章)
 Noryeok Medal: 노력장 (努力章)

Notable recipients
Kim Yong-ki

References

External links

Orders, decorations, and medals of South Korea